The Mooresville Graded School District is a public school district located in Mooresville, North Carolina. It was established in 1905. The school district is notable for early adaption of an academically successful digital learning program which provides each student with a laptop computer and integrates its use into classroom instruction.

Digital learning program
The school leases MacBook Air laptops from Apple and provides one to each student. Extremely low rates for broad-band service for low-income students have been negotiated. The program, which costs about $1,100,000 a year for lease fees and software, was financed by cutbacks in other areas such as increase in class size. A 10% layoff of teachers in 2009 and 2010 offered an opportunity for retirement of teachers who most strongly resisted the change to digital learning. Graduation and achievement have increased dramatically with the school ranked 3rd in North Carolina for achievement and 2nd in graduation rates.

Demographics
Minorities make up 27% of Mooresville students are minorities with 40% eligible for free or reduced-price lunches. Success of the school's digital learning program has increased demand for real estate in the community.

List of schools
 Park View Elementary (grades K–3)
 Parkview elementary's mascot is a Patriot.
 South Elementary (grades K–3)
South Elementary's mascot is the Stars.
 Rocky River Elementary (grades K–3)
 Rocky River Elementary's mascot is a Racer. 
 East Mooresvlle Intermediate (Grades 4–6)
EMIS's mascot is an Eagle.
 Mooresville Intermediate (Grades 4–6)
MIS's mascot is a Bobcat.
 Mooresville Middle School (Grades 7–8)
MMS's mascot is a Red Imp. 
 Mooresville High School (Grades 9–12)
MHS's mascot is the Blue Devil.
 N.F. Woods Technology & Art Center (part of MHS)

Leadership
In 2013, Mooresville Graded School District's Superintendent, Dr. Mark Edwards, was named the American Association of School Administrator's National Superintendent of the Year.

References

External links

 Dr. Crystal Hill: The Digital School (8 minutes), Stanford Graduate School of Business

Education in Iredell County, North Carolina
School districts established in 1905
School districts in North Carolina
Virtual learning environments
History of education in the United States
1905 establishments in North Carolina